This is a list of endemic birds of the Andaman and Nicobar Islands.  It is one of a series providing information about endemism among birds in the world's various zoogeographic zones.

Endemic Bird Areas
BirdLife International has defined the following as Endemic Bird Areas:

 The Andaman Islands
 The Nicobar Islands

List of species
The following is a list of species endemic to the Andaman and Nicobar Islands, India:

Species endemic to the Andaman islands
Andaman serpent-eagle, Spilornis elgini
Andaman crake, Rallina canningi
Brown coucal, Centropus andamanensis
Andaman scops owl, Otus balli
Hume's boobook, Ninox obscura
Andaman barn-owl, Tyto deroepstorffi
Andaman nightjar, Caprimulgus andamanicus
Narcondam hornbill, Rhyticeros narcondami
Andaman woodpecker, Dryocopus hodgei
Andaman drongo, Dicrurus andamanensis
Andaman treepie, Dendrocitta bayleyii
Andaman shama, Copsychus albiventris
Andaman bulbul, Pycnonotus  fuscoflavescens
Andaman cuckooshrike, Coracina dobsoni
Andaman flowerpecker, Dicaeum virescens

Species endemic to the Nicobar islands

Nicobar imperial-pigeon, Ducula nicobarica
South Nicobar serpent eagle, Spilornis klossi
Nicobar sparrowhawk, Accipiter butleri
Nicobar parakeet, Psittacula caniceps
Nicobar bulbul, Ixos nicobariensis
Nicobar jungle flycatcher, Cyornis nicobaricus
Nicobar scops-owl, Otus alius 
Nicobar megapode, Megapodius nicobariensis (possibly extirpated over Andaman range)

Species endemic to the two island groups

Andaman woodpigeon, Columba palumboides
Andaman green pigeon, Treron chloropterus
Andaman cuckoo-dove, Macropygia rufipennis
Andaman boobook, Ninox affinis
White-headed starling, Sturnia erythropygia

See also
 Wildlife of India
 Flora of India
 Fauna of India
 List of trees of the Andaman Islands

Andaman
Andaman
birds of Andaman and Nicobar Islands
'